Bernie Johnston (born September 15, 1956) is a Canadian former professional ice hockey player. He played in 57 National Hockey League games with the Hartford Whalers between 1979 and 1981. The rest of his career, which lasted from 1976 to 1989, was spent in the minor leagues and in Switzerland. As a youth, he played in the 1968 Quebec International Pee-Wee Hockey Tournament with a minor ice hockey team from Toronto. After his playing career Johnston worked as a coach in Switzerland and Germany, as well as serving as general manager for the Frankfurt Lions between 1997 and 2002.

Career statistics

Regular season and playoffs

References

External links

1956 births
Living people
Binghamton Whalers players
Canadian expatriate ice hockey players in Switzerland
Canadian ice hockey centres
EHC Basel players
Hartford Whalers players
Hershey Bears players
EHC Kloten players
Maine Mariners players
Ice hockey people from Toronto
Springfield Indians players
Toronto Marlboros players
Undrafted National Hockey League players